"Shady Lane" is a song by Pavement that appears on the album Brighten the Corners. It was also released as a two-part single and as an EP, which collects the B-sides from both the British singles. The single was accompanied by a video directed by Spike Jonze. "Shady Lane" would become a top 40 hit in the UK for the band.

Background 
The EP was released June 10, 1997 on Matador Records. It collects all the B-sides from the two "Shady Lane" UK singles. "Shady Lane (krossfader)" is a very similar version to the one on the album Brighten the Corners; the gap between the first chorus and second verse is shortened and the extended instrumental part towards the end (identified on the album as J vs. S) is omitted. The song "Slowly Typed" can also be found on Brighten the Corners, where it is named "Type Slowly". The version here is quite different, faster and more lo-fi with a country touch.

Track listing

Part 1 - Shady Lane/Slow Typed

Part 2 - Shady Lane/Wanna Mess You Around

7" – Shady Lane/Unseen Power of the Picket Fence

EP

In popular culture
 In the television series Radio Free Roscoe, main character Lily's radio nickname is "Shady Lane". Lily states that Pavement's song "Shady Lane" is the song that inspired her to play guitar.

References

Pavement (band) songs
Pavement (band) albums
1997 EPs
Music videos directed by Spike Jonze